The Austria Classic Hotel Wien is a three-star hotel, on Praterstraße in Vienna's second district, the Leopoldstadt. It is a member of the  Austria Classic Hotels group and was named 'Hotel Nordbahn' until a rebranding in January 2008.

History 

The building 'Zum schwarzen Tor' on Praterstraße Nr.72 (named Jägerzeile until 1862) was completed in 1808. It originally served as residential house for a Peter Danhauser and only comprised two floors. The existing building was extended by one floor, and established as 'Hotel Nordbahn', because of tourist accommodation needs through increased international traffic.

From 1843 to 1849 further extensions and adaptations were undertaken by hotel owner Josef Scheiflinger. Since that time the hotel has remained a family property. Between 1944 and 1945, during the Second World War, the building was partially destroyed, and was under Soviet administration until 1955. After the Allied Occupation of Austria, the hotel management was restored to Kommerzialrat Felix Scheiflinger, who had succeeded his father Josef Scheiflinger in 1908. In 1961, the management was transferred to Erika Blumauer, Felix Scheiflinger's daughter, who modernised the building and passed management to her son, Reinhard Blumauer, in 1973. Hotel Nordbahn was rebranded as Austria Classic Hotel Wien on 1 January 2008. In 2010 Reinhard Blumauer passed management to his daughter Ines Pietsch, who "became one of the youngest hotel managers of Austria".

Notable guests 
 The Austro-American composer and film score composition pioneer Max Steiner was born on 10 May 1888 in Hotel Nordbahn as 'Maximilian Raoul Steiner'. At his time Steiner was one of the best-known composers in Hollywood. Sometimes referred to as "the father of film music", Steiner is widely regarded today as one of the greatest film score composers in the history of cinema. Steiner composed hundreds of film scores, amongst those Casablanca, Gone with the Wind and King Kong. On the occasion of Max Steiner's 100th birthday a commemorative plaque was revealed at the hotel by owner Reinhard Blumauer, Bezirksvorsteher (head of district) Heinz Weißmann and Viennese mayor Helmut Zilk.
 Fine artist and playwright Stanisław Wyspiański, a  Polish member of the Vienna Secession, resided in Hotel Nordbahn in summer 1904, en route from convalescent care in Bad Hall to his hometown Krakau. Since 1996 a plaque on the facade of the hotel commemorates the 50th anniversary of the Österreichisch-Polnische Gesellschaft (Austrian-Polish Society) and Wyspiański's frequent stays at the hotel, where amongst others he wrote his German dramatic fragment "Weimar 1829".

Notes

Literature 
Referencing Literature:
 Hermann Bahr (Hg.): Briefe von Josef Kainz. Wien: Rikola Verlag, 1922
 Helga Gibs: Leopoldstadt: kleine Welt am grossen Strom. Wien: Mohl, 1997, S.67, 
 Albert Paris Gütersloh: Die tanzende Törin: Roman. München: Langen-Müller, 1973
 Cilly Kugelmann, Hanno Loewy: So einfach war das: jüdische Kindheit und Jugend in Deutschland seit 1945. Zeitzeugnisse aus dem Jüdischen Museum Berlin. Köln: DuMont 2002
 Allan H. Mankoff: Mankoff's lusty Europe: the first all-purpose European guide to sex, love and romance. New York City: Viking Press, 1972
 Franz Julius Schneeberger: Banditen im Franck: Politisch-socialer Roman aus der Gegenwart. Von A. v. S. Band 2,  Wien, Pest, Leipzig: A. Hartleben, 1867
 Siegfried Weyr: Wien: Magie der Inneren Stadt. Band 1 von Eine Stadt erzählt. Wien: Zsolnay, 1968

External links 

 Austria Classic Hotel Wien

Hotels in Vienna
Buildings and structures in Leopoldstadt
Tourist attractions in Vienna
Hotel buildings completed in 1838
Hotels established in 1838
1838 establishments in the Austrian Empire
19th-century architecture in Austria